Events in the year 1842 in Belgium.

Incumbents
Monarch: Leopold I
Prime Minister: Jean-Baptiste Nothomb

Events
 Royal Academy of Archaeology of Belgium founded.
 23 May – Provincial elections
 16 July – "Linen convention" exempts Belgian textiles from French protectionist measures in return for a reduction in the Belgian tariff on French wines.
 23 September – Education Act stipulates that each local authority must maintain at least one primary school.
 5 November – Belgian-Dutch convention on trade and inland navigation signed in The Hague.

Publications
Periodicals
Almanach royal de Belgique (Brussels, Librairie Polytechnique)
 Annuaire politique, écclésiastique, judiciaire, noliaire, militaire, administratif et commercial de la Belgique (Brussels, Librairie Polytechnique)
Messager des sciences historiques (Ghent)
La renaissance: Chronique des arts et de la littérature, 3.
Revue de Bruxelles

Monographs and reports
Statistique de la Belgique: 1831–40 (Brussels)

Births
7 May – Isala Van Diest, physician (died 1916)
24 August – Edouard Agneessens, painter (died 1885)
6 December – Marie Collart, painter (died 1911)

Deaths
10 March – Joseph Van Crombrugghe (born 1770), politician
6 September – Jean-Baptiste Van Mons (born 1765), pomologist

References

 
1840s in Belgium